William Stinson is the name of:
K. William Stinson, politician from Washington
William W. Stinson, Canadian railroad executive
William G. Stinson, politician from Pennsylvania